The Temenggong of Johor is one of the members of the Orang Kaya Council first established by Sultan Abdul Jalil Shah himself. The first Temenggong being appointed in 1757 was Temenggong Abdul Jamal.

The Temenggong of Johor was given the task of controlling the security of the Sultan and safeguarding the State and exercising control over all the territories of the Johor Empire.

Temenggong of Johor was granted territorial control by the Sultan of Johor and Singapura (later Singapore) as the representative of the Sultan of Johor-Riau, just as the Grand Vizier was given Pahang as the territorial control, while the Temenggong of Muar was given Muar respectively.

The descendants of Temenggong would later found the new Sultanate on the mainland of Johor with the first Temenggong being Daeng Ibrahim.

Temenggongs of Johor

References

House of Temenggong of Johor
Sultans of Johor
Johor royal houses
History of Johor
Government of Johor